Skubal may refer to:

 John Skubal (born 1946), American politician who served in the Kansas Senate
 Tarik Skubal (born 1996), American baseball pitcher for the Detroit Tigers